Tau Draconis, Latinized from τ Draconis, is an astrometric binary star system in the northern circumpolar constellation of Draco. The star is faintly visible to the naked eye, having an apparent visual magnitude of 4.45. Based upon an annual parallax shift of 22.28 mas as measured from Earth, it is located around 146 light years from the Sun. Its proper motion is propelling it across the sky at the rate of 0.176 arc seconds per year.

This is a K-type giant star with a stellar classification of  K2 III:, where the semi-colon indicates some uncertainty about its spectral value. It is considered metal-rich star and is past the first dredge-up phase of its post-main sequence evolution, although it shows under-abundances of carbon and oxygen in its spectrum. The star has 1.25 times the mass of the Sun and is an estimated 6.48 billion years old. It is radiating 48 times the solar luminosity from its enlarged photosphere at an effective temperature of 4,413 K.

References

K-type giants
Draco (constellation)
Draconis, Tau
Durchmusterung objects
Draconis, 60
181984
094648
7352
Astrometric binaries